Luceafărul Theatre in Chișinău, Moldova, is a public theatre, founded in 1960.

See also
Luceafăr
Luceafărul (poem)

References

External links
Official website 
Teatrul „Luceafărul”, la 50 de ani at timpul.md 

Culture in Chișinău
Buildings and structures in Chișinău
Theatres in Moldova
Theatres completed in 1960
1960 establishments in the Moldavian Soviet Socialist Republic
Event venues established in 1960